Poly Bridge is a simulation-puzzle video game series developed and published by Dry Cactus. The franchise was introduced in 2016 and released two installments, with the third title, Poly Bridge 3, set to be launched on 30 May 2023.

Games

Poly Bridge (2016)

The first installment of the series started with an early access on Steam in 2015. The game was fully released initially for Microsoft Windows on 12 June 2016. The basic material includes steel, wood, rope, and cable, alongside hydraulics, which can be used to move pieces of the bridge.

Poly Bridge 2 (2020)

The second installment of the series was released on 28 May 2020 for Linux, macOS and Microsoft Windows via Epic Games Store and Steam. Android and iOS versions were available in October 2020. The game features a new material, spring.

Poly Bridge 3 (2023)

A third title was revealed on 16 March 2023, targeting for a release on 30 May 2023 for Linux, macOS and Microsoft Windows platforms. Foundation is confirmed to be introduced as a new material.

Reception

The series has sold over 6 million copies prior to the release of Poly Bridge 3.

References

External links

Puzzle video games by series
Simulation video games by series
Video game franchises introduced in 2016